The Pacific burrowing wasp (Philanthus multimaculatus) is a species of bee-hunting wasp — or a "beewolf" — of Western North America.

References

External links
The Nesting Behavior of Philanthus multimaculatus

Crabronidae
Hymenoptera of North America
Insects of Mexico
Fauna of the Western United States
Fauna of California
Natural history of Arizona
Natural history of British Columbia
Natural history of New Mexico
Fauna of the California chaparral and woodlands
Fauna of the Sonoran Desert
Natural history of the Mojave Desert
Fauna of the Rocky Mountains
Insects described in 1891